The Manor is a 2021 American gothic supernatural horror film written and directed by Axelle Carolyn. The film stars Barbara Hershey, Bruce Davison, Stacey Travis, Ciera Payton, Jill Larson and Mark Steger.

The film was released in the United States on October 8, 2021 by Amazon Studios, as the eighth installment in the anthological Welcome to the Blumhouse film series.

Plot
After suffering a stroke at her 70th birthday party, Judith Albright, a professional dancer in her youth who is now a dance instructor, is moved into a nursing home after being diagnosed with Parkinson's disease. Her 17-year-old grandson, Josh, whom she is very close to, opposes the move, while his mother, Judith’s daughter, Barbara, tries to comfort him. Judith assures Josh that the move is best for everyone. But soon she notices strange behaviors and the deaths of other residents. She imagines a tree like figure looming in her room. Eventually it is revealed that three of the other elderly people living there are much older even and have been using witchcraft to suck the life forces out of victims (patients of the Manor). This allows them to become young every nightfall, returning to their old forms when the sun rises. Judith decides to join them in the end so that she may live longer to have time with Josh, who also comes to work at the Manor.

Cast
 Barbara Hershey as Judith Albright
 Bruce Davison as Roland
 Nicholas Alexander as Josh
 Jill Larson as Trish
 Fran Bennett as Ruth
 Katie A. Keane as Barbara Albright
 Ciera Payton as Liesel
 Nancy Linehan Charles as Annette
 Shelly Robertson as Elizabeth
 Stacey Travis as Ms. Benson
 Mark Steger as Minion
 Cissy Wellman as Imogen

Reception
On review aggregator website Rotten Tomatoes, the film holds an approval rating of 62% based on 29 reviews, with an average rating of 6/10. On Metacritic, the film holds a rating of 59 out of 100, based on 6 critics, indicating "mixed or average reviews".

References

External links
 
 

2021 films
2021 horror films
Amazon Studios films
American supernatural horror films
Blumhouse Productions films
Films set in hospitals
2020s supernatural horror films
2020s English-language films
Amazon Prime Video original films
2020s American films